Lobelia spicata, commonly called the pale spiked lobelia, is a flowering plant in the bellflower family.

It is native to North America, where it is widespread in southern Canada and the eastern United States. It is found in a variety of sunny and semi-shade habitats, including prairies, glades, woodlands, and disturbed areas. Several varieties have been recognized across its range, although their distinction is still uncertain.

It is a short-lived perennial, usually flowering below taller grasses and forbs. It produces a spike of white or pale blue flowers in the summer.

References

spicata
Flora of the Eastern United States
Flora of Arkansas